The 2020–21 Little Rock Trojans women's basketball team represented the University of Arkansas at Little Rock during the 2020–21 NCAA Division I women's basketball season. The basketball team, led by eighteenth-year head coach Joe Foley, played all home games at the Jack Stephens Center along with the Little Rock Trojans men's basketball team. They were members of the Sun Belt Conference.

Previous season 
The Trojans finished the 2019–20 season 12–19, 9–9 in Sun Belt play to finish sixth in the conference. They made it to the 2019-20 Sun Belt Conference women's basketball tournament where they defeated Appalachian State in the First Round before being defeated by Louisiana in the Quarterfinals. Following the season, all conference tournaments as well as all postseason play was cancelled due to the COVID-19 pandemic.

Offseason

Departures

Transfers

Recruiting

Roster

Schedule and results

|-
!colspan=9 style=| Non-conference Regular Season
|-

|-
!colspan=9 style=| Conference Regular Season
|-

|-
!colspan=9 style=| Sun Belt Tournament

See also
 2020–21 Little Rock Trojans men's basketball team

References

Little Rock Trojans women's basketball seasons
Little Rock Trojans
Little Rock Trojans women's basketball
Little Rock Trojans women's basketball